Bloomingdale School may refer to:

Bloomingdale School (Illinois), Bloomingdale, Illinois
Bloomingdale School (Massachusetts), Worcester, Massachusetts
Bloomingdale School of Music, New York, New York

See also
Bloomingdale School District, Bloomingdale, New Jersey